Rehna Hai Teri Palkon Ki Chhaon Mein is an Indian soap opera that aired on NDTV Imagine in India between August 2009 and September 2010 airing weekdays at 9pm. It is a story of an orphan girl, Suman, who wants to be part of a joint family and soon gets a chance. The show was very popular on Imagine TV and had some of the best their target rating points (TRPs). It was replaced by Gunahon Ka Devta.

The second season of the series, Palkon Ki Chhaon Mein 2 on Dangal TV. It stars Trupti Mishra, Vin Rana and Ashish Dixit.

Plot
This is the story of a young orphaned woman, whose dreams of finding family and love come true when she gets a chance to be a part of an extremely lovable and traditional joint family.

Suman lives in a girls' hostel with her best friend Kanchan, who hails from a rich, traditional and loving family. Kanchan's mother Kadambari meets Suman and decides that this girl will be her future daughter-in-law. Suman meets Kadambari's son Karan and they take a sudden liking for each other. To Suman's shock, it is revealed that she has been chosen for Karthik, Karan's elder brother. Suman is in a dilemma: She has to choose between her love for Karan and the feelings of a family which has treated her like a daughter.

After facing many difficulties, Karan and Suman get married. On the way to their honeymoon, the brakes on their car fail. Karan shoves Suman out but is unable to get out himself. The car dives into a waterfall and Karan is presumed dead. After that, the whole family begins to hate Suman, except for Karthik and his new fiancée Nandini. But even Nandini becomes an enemy when she sees that Karthik cares for Suman. Karthik marries Nandini. But their marriage breaks up when Nandini's evil nature is exposed before the whole family.

Meanwhile, Suman goes through many trials and tribulations. After a long time, she is once again accepted by her in-laws. By now, she and Karthik are in love. They get married with the blessings of the family. Just then, Karan comes back, alive. When he learns about Suman's re-marriage with Karthik, he is very angry. He tries to break up their relationship but fails. Later, Karan marries a young woman named Paro and is happy with her.

Fate plays another trick on Suman. A young widow related to Suman's father-in-law comes to stay with the family. This woman is attracted to Karthik. She makes it appear that he has outraged her modesty under the influence of a drug. Then she pretends to be expecting his child. Karthik is forced to promise that he will marry her. The woman kidnaps Suman and kills her. Suman's spirit comes back, however, and exposes her killer before leaving the world. Karthik and his family are heartbroken at losing Suman. A few years later, there is another Suman in the family – Karan and Paro's little daughter. But the vacuum in Karthik's life remains unfilled.

Cast
 Amrapali Dubey – Suman
 Sumeet Vyas –  Karthik
 Shoaib Ibrahim – Karan
 Indira Krishnan – Kadambari
 Madhuri Sanjiv – Chandrika Devi
 Garima Jain – Ruby
 Payal Shukla – Kanchan
 Sunayana Fozdar – Nandini
 Aayam Mehta – Devender Singh
 Sharmilee Raj – Vidya
 Rubina Shergill – Guddi
 Manish Naggdev – Tanmay
 Shweta Rastogi as Paro
 Shriya Bisht as Niharika

References

External links
 Official Website
  Rehna Hai Teri Palkon Ki Chhaon Mein 1 on Dangal Play 

Indian television soap operas
Imagine TV original programming
2009 Indian television series debuts
2010 Indian television series endings